Kenneth MacDonald (born Kenneth Dollins; September 8, 1901 – May 5, 1972) was an American film actor. Born in Portland, Indiana, MacDonald made more than 220 film and television appearances between 1931 and 1970. His name is sometimes seen as Kenneth McDonald; his later roles sometimes credited him as Kenneth R. MacDonald.

Career
MacDonald began his career as a stage actor. In 1923 he appeared in his first feature film, Slow as Lightning. He came to Hollywood in the early 1930s, where he played small roles in low-budget, independent productions.

In 1939 Kenneth MacDonald was signed by Columbia Pictures for the studio's Charles Starrett westerns. MacDonald perfected a cool, debonair demeanor, which usually masked an evil side as a con man, outlaw, or thief. His speaking voice was rich and well modulated, often being gentle and ominous at the same time, in the Boris Karloff manner. Also, like Karloff, he seldom raised his voice, making his characters both dominant and dangerous. This quality made MacDonald an effective villain in Columbia's adventure serials like Mandrake the Magician, The Phantom, and Black Arrow. He was also adept at playing sympathetic roles, usually as calm authority figures (police official, prison psychiatrist, judge, etc.).

Actors in Columbia's stock company almost always worked in the studio's two-reel comedy shorts as well as features and serials, but Kenneth MacDonald did not join the short-subject fraternity until 1945, when he appeared opposite comedy stars Gus Schilling and Richard Lane. He is probably best known today for his work with The Three Stooges.

MacDonald developed a flair for comedy, and he made memorable appearances in Stooge comedies including Monkey Businessmen, Hold That Lion!, Crime on Their Hands, Punchy Cowpunchers, and Loose Loot. Beginning in 1953, the comedy in the Columbia shorts became even more physical under producer-director Jules White, and MacDonald obligingly got plastered with pies, fruit, and other missiles. He also returned to Columbia's serial unit, which was then filming low-budget remakes of his older serials using much of the original footage; MacDonald appeared in new scenes to match his old ones. He left the Columbia shorts department in 1955, but still appeared occasionally in feature films; he played a member of the court martial board in The Caine Mutiny (1954), and  had a bit role as Jerry Lewis's father in The Ladies' Man (1961).

Television 
MacDonald began working in television in 1949, in The Lone Ranger (episode eight; he would return to the series in episode 173, 1955). From 1951 to 1953 MacDonald was a frequent guest star, mostly as a sheriff, in the syndicated television series, The Range Rider, with Jock Mahoney and Dick Jones. He appeared six times as Colonel Parker in the ABC western series Colt .45. In 1960 MacDonald appeared as Duggan on the TV western Laramie in the episode titled "Duel at Parkinson Town.".  He also appeared in a number of episodes of the TV western Bat Masterson with Gene Barry (MacDonald appeared with Dyan Cannon in "The Price of Paradise" in 1961.)

Kenneth MacDonald's most prolific work in television was in 32 episodes of CBS's Perry Mason. He played the recurring role of a judge (sometimes named Carter, sometimes unnamed) between 1957 and 1966.

Death
MacDonald died of brain and lung cancer at the Motion Picture & Television Country House and Hospital in Woodland Hills, California at the age of 70. He was buried in Forest Lawn Memorial Park in Hollywood Hills.

Partial filmography

 Slow as Lightning (1923)
 South of the Equator (1924)
 The Speed Demon (1925)
 Makers of Men (1925)
 He Who Laughs Last (1925)
 The Roaring Road (1926)
 The Law of the Snow Country (1926)
 The Last Mile (1932)
 Cocktail Hour (1933)
 Two-Fisted Rangers (1939)
 The Taming of the West (1939)
 The Durango Kid (1940)
 The Wildcat of Tucson (1940)
 Confessions of Boston Blackie (1941)
 Stand By All Networks (1942)
 The Phantom (1943)
 West of the Rio Grande  (1944)
 Monkey Businessmen (1946) (Three Stooges short subject)
 Crossfire (1947) as Major (uncredited)
 Hold That Lion! (1947)
 Dark Passage (1947) as Humphrey Bogart character before facial surgery (uncredited)
 Shivering Sherlocks (1948) (Three Stooges short subject)
 Crime on Their Hands (1948) (Three Stooges short subject)
 Frontier Agent (1948)
 Return of the Bad Men (1948)
 Train to Alcatraz (1948)
 Vagabond Loafers (1949) (Three Stooges short subject)
 Punchy Cowpunchers (1950) (Three Stooges short subject)
 Studio Stoops (1950) (Three Stooges short subject)
 Hula-La-La (1951) (Three Stooges short subject)
 Three Dark Horses (1952) (Three Stooges short subject)
 Booty and the Beast (1953) (Three Stooges short subject)
 Loose Loot (1953) (Three Stooges short subject)
 The Caine Mutiny (1954) as a Court-Martial Board Member (uncredited)
 Of Cash and Hash (1955) (Three Stooges short subject)
 Hot Ice (1955)(Three Stooges short subject)
 Blunder Boys (1955) (Three Stooges short subject)
 Scheming Schemers (1956) (Three Stooges short subject)
 The Fastest Gun Alive (1956) uncredited
 40 Guns to Apache Pass (1966)
 Fantastic Voyage (1966) Henry - heart monitoring

References

External links

Kenneth MacDonald  at threestooges.net

1901 births
1972 deaths
American male film actors
Male actors from Indiana
Burials at Forest Lawn Memorial Park (Hollywood Hills)
20th-century American male actors
20th-century American comedians